Singleton railway station may refer to any of a number of railway stations.

In England:
Singleton railway station (Lancashire)
Singleton railway station (West Sussex)

In Australia:
Singleton railway station, New South Wales